Winnifred Kyei Selby is a young Ghanaian social entrepreneur and the president of the EPF Educational Empowerment Initiative based in Kumasi, Ashanti Region of Ghana. She co-founded the Ghana Bamboo Bike Initiative with Bernice Dapaah at the age of 15. And At age 17, she established another business, the Afrocentric Bamboo Initiative. In 2018, she became the first Ghanaian to be inducted into the Royal Institute of Singapore.

Education and career 
Selby attended Joy Standard College. She is also an alumna of Cambridge University Leading For Change Executive Education and Fellow of the Royal Commonwealth Society. She co-founded the Ghana Bamboo Bike Initiative with Bernice Dapaah at the age of 15 and the Afrocentric Bamboo Initiative at the age of 17 right after completing her secondary education.

Awards and achievements 
 Anzisha Prize Fellow
 World Economic Forum Global shaper
 Board member of Dawadawa Impact Investment Fund
 Board member of the SHE Scholarships Fund of the EPF Educational Empowerment Initiative.
 Finalist of the 2014 Cartier Women’s Initiative Awards
 Honoured Airtel Touching Lives 2014 Award
 She was honoured 2015 World of Children Award in New York
 Winner of the 2016 New African Woman in Science , Technology & Innovation Award
 Winner of the 2017 Queen’s Young Leader Award
 Featured in Forbes as one of the social entrepreneurs in Africa to watch
 First Ghanaian to be inducted into the Royal Institute of Singapore
 She has hosted a TED talk with TEDx Accra
 Invited by Former President of the United States, Barack Obama to be part of the 2015 Global Entrepreneurship Summit in Nairobi, Kenya

Philanthropy and activism

EPL Educational Empowerment Initiative 
To break down barriers to education and empower young people from deprived communities, Selby founded the EPF Educational Empowerment Initiative.

Winnifred's Menstrual Pads for Dignity 
She also founded the Winnifred’s Menstrual Pads for Dignity Project which provides free disposable menstrual products for needy girls in the most deprived districts in Ghana.

Happy Feed Initiative 
Selby initiated the Happy Feed Initiative, which complements the government of Ghana free school feeding and free uniforms program. This initiative provides new shoes and other educational supplies such as bags, books, and calculators to needy school children in deprived communities.

Ghana Girls College 
In partnership with private universities in Ghana, she also started the Ghana Girls College Scholarship program which offers scholarships to brilliant but needy high school girls

W3 Initiative 
She is the founder for Winnie Women's World.  W3 Initiative is a non profit organization made of promotes gender equality, women empowerment and girl and children education.

See also 
 Bernice Dapaah
 Queen's Young Leader Award

References 

Year of birth missing (living people)
Living people
Social entrepreneurs
Ghanaian activists
Ghanaian feminists
Ghanaian women activists
Ghanaian women's rights activists
Alumni of the University of Cambridge
Recipients of the Queen’s Young Leader Award
21st-century Ghanaian businesswomen
21st-century Ghanaian businesspeople